Master Canchupati Venkata Rao Venkatasami Rao, popularly known as Master C.V.V. (4 August 1868 - 12 May 1922) was an Indian philosopher, yogi, and guru. Master C.V.V served as the Chairman of Kumbakonam Municipal Council for some time and later became a spiritual reformer, introducing his visions on human progress and spiritual evolution.

Biography
Master C. V. V. was born on 4 August 1868 in Kumbakonam, Tamil Nadu, India (then part of British India) into a middle class Brahmin family. His family name was Canchupati. His parents are Sri Kuppuswamy Iyyengar and Smt.  Kamamma.  During the reign of the Vijayanagar dynasty, their family moved from the regions of  Andhra Pradesh to Tamil Nadu. His Upanayana took place at the age of five. he was given in adoption to his paternal aunt Srimathi Kanchupati  Subbamma,  who educated him. His elementary education took place in Kumbhakonam  itself and his higher education in Srirangam.

Personal life
Master C. V. V. married Rukmini in 1880 when he was 12 years old and they had three sons and a daughter. His wife Rukmini died in 1904 when she was 36 years. At the age of 38 in 1908 he married Venkamma with whom he had another three daughters and a son.

Philosophy and spiritual vision
Master C.V.V founded a new yoga system known by the name "Bhrikta Rahita Taraka Raja Yoga" or "Electronic Yoga" in 1910 with a goal to make changes to human format and to cosmic forces influencing human format in order to give eternal life to humanity.

"Bhrikta  Rahita Taraka  Raja  Yoga",  means the Raja Yoga that neutralizes the accumulated past Karma.

Vedavyas, who was a leading exponent of Master CVV's Philosophy, in his book The Electronic Yoga of Master C.V.V. discusses about this new yoga system, Unlike traditional yoga in which one begins to work with first chakra and progress upwards, with the development of each chakra, giving greater spiritual awareness, in this system, the crown chakra opens first and radiated energy downwards. Master C.V.V compares the body to a battery with the left side conveying negative electronic current through Ida Nadi  and right side carrying the positive current of the Pingala Nadi. When folded palms are brought together, sparking is produced in the heart chakra. Vedavyas also discusses numerology, astrology, latent power of intelligence and the striking similarities he finds in the work of Madame Blavatsky, George Gurdjieff, Sri Aurobindo, Ramana Maharshi and Master C.V.V. in a hash of zealous prose, not to mention the serendipitous significance of the year 1910 in the lives of all these people and cosmic events surrounding the arrival of Halley's Comet.

Master CVV calls his disciples as mediums.  At present Master CVV yoga is spread throughout the world.  Now Master CVV's mediums are actively involved in conducting courses to the new incoming mediums.

During his lifetime Master CVV developed several courses for regulating the planets and rectifications.  Master MTA is the guru of Master CVV.  He is one of the Greatest Spiritual scientist of our times. His yoga is called the electronic yoga.  It works instantaneously when invoked.  The regular time for doing this prayer is Morning 6.00 AM and Evening 6.00 PM.  During his life period Master CVV cured many people from sufferings of various diseases that were not curable.

Master C.V.V. did not release this line to others to practice after he left physical. Master C.V.V closed admissions to this line on 31-1-1922 as found in His diary published by the followers.

Books
Books on Master CVV's Yoga:

 Master C.V.V's Yoga Basic Information - Telugu & English based on Original writings (https://archive.org/details/master-cvvs-yoga-basic-information)
 Bhrukta Rahita Raja Yogam - Sri Kotha Rama Kotaiah (Tata garu)
 Master CVV - Sri Ekkirala Krishnamacharaya
 Master CVV and his Electronic Yoga - Dr Ekkirala Veda Vyasa I.A.S (Retd)., Ph.D
 Bhrukta Rahita Raja Yogam - Prasnalu-Samadhanamlu - Gurudev. A. V. Srinivasa Acharyulu
 Master CVV - Sri Sarvari
 Master CVV-N.R.B.V - Sri N.B.V. Rama Moorthy
 New Yoga - Sri Narayana Iyer

References

Sources

External links
www.mastercvv.com 
www.worldteachertrust.org.

1868 births
1922 deaths
Vedanta
Indian Hindu spiritual teachers
Telugu people
Telugu poets
20th-century Indian philosophers
Indian spiritual writers
Theosophy
20th-century Hindu philosophers and theologians
People from Tamil Nadu
19th-century Hindu religious leaders
20th-century Hindu religious leaders